Events in the year 1974 in Germany.

Incumbents
President
Gustav Heinemann (until 30 June 1974)
Walter Scheel (from 1 July 1974)
Chancellor
Willy Brandt (until 7 May 1974)
Walter Scheel (Acting; 7 May – 16 May 1974)
Helmut Schmidt (from 16 May 1974)

Events
 Germany in the Eurovision Song Contest 1974
 29 March - Launch of the Volkswagen Golf, a front-wheel drive hatchback which is planned to replace the Beetle.	
 2 April - Westfalenstadion is opened in Dortmund.
 24 April - Guillaume Affair
 16 May - The First Schmidt cabinet led by Helmut Schmidt was sworn in.	
 23 May - West German presidential election, 1974
 13 June-7th July - 1974 FIFA World Cup, held in West Germany
 21 June - 2 July - 24th Berlin International Film Festival
 7 October - East German Republic Day Parade of 1974

Births
 January 1 - Marco Schreyl, German television presenter
 January 4 - Danilo Hondo, German cyclist
 January 21 - Kim Dotcom, German-Finnish internet activist
 January 22 - Annette Frier, German comedian
 January 30 - Maren Eggert, German actress
 March 5 - Barbara Schöneberger, German actress and television presenter
 March 20 - Janine Kunze, German actress
 March 28 - Matthias Koeberlin, German actor
 March 21 - Klaus Lederer, German politician
 April 1 - Sandra Völker, German swimmer
 April 7 - Ronny Ostwald, German athlete
 May 23 - Manuela Schwesig, German politician
 June 6 - Dunja Hayali, German journalist
 June 9 - Benjamin Heisenberg, German film director
 April 1 - Sandra Völker, German swimmer
 July 14 - Martina Hill, actress, comedian and impersonator
 July 22 - Franka Potente, German actress
 August 19 - Anja Knippel, German runner
 August 22 - Peter Tauber, German politician
 September 9 - Philipp Kadelbach, German film director
 September 17 - Bianca Shomburg, German singer
 September 25 - Timo Hoffmann, German boxer
 September 26 - Andreas Scheuer, German politician
 October 29 - Hansjörg Schmidt, German politician
 November 9 - Sven Hannawald, German ski jumper
 November 9 - Kurt Krömer, German comedian and television presenter
 December 4 - Manuela Henkel, German cross-country skier

Deaths
 February 13 - Adolf Arndt, German politician (born 1904)
 February 24 - Robert A. Stemmle, German film director and screenwriter (born 1903)
 April 20 - Richard Huelsenbeck, German poet and writer (born 1892)
 May 24 - Konrad Frey, German gymnast (born 1909)
 June 24 - Gero Wecker, German film producer (born 1923)
 July 29 - Erich Kästner, German author, poet, screenwriter and satirist (born 1899)
 August 14 — Arnulf Klett, German lawyer and politician  (born 1905)
 October 10 - Marie Luise Kaschnitz, German writer (born 1901)
 October 27- Rudolf Dassler, German founder of the sportswear company Puma (born 1898)
 November 9 — Holger Meins, German cinematography student (born 1941)
 November 16 - Walther Meissner, German physicist (born 1882)
 December 3 - Hans Leibelt, German film actress (born 1885)
 December 14 — Kurt Hahn, German educator (born 1886)

See also
 1974 in German television

References

 
Years of the 20th century in Germany
1970s in Germany
Germany
Germany